Nathaniel Mtui was a Tanzanian historian of Chagga origin born in 1892 in the mtaa of Mshiri in Marangu, Kilimanjaro Region, Tanzania. He was a teacher at the Colonial German Lutheran mission in Marangu. He is known for being the first person of Chagga origin to write history of the Chagga people. He wrote the Chaggan history in Kichagga, German, and Swahili from 1913-1916. During the German occupation, he wrote for German Lutheran pastors, Johannes Raum and Bruno Gutmann, who then used Mtui's notes for their own books on the Chagga people. During the British occupation Nathaniel was hired by Major Dundas, paying him 16 shillings for each full note book wrote about the Chaggan people. No one knows how many note books Mtui wrote for the 3 men, as many are missing, Gutmann preserved 9 of Mtui's note books. These 9 of Mtui's notebooks focus more on the histories of the central and eastern Chaggaland. Mtui died in 1927 at the age of 35.

References

People from Kilimanjaro Region
Tanzanian historians
1892 births
1927 deaths
20th-century historians
Historians of Tanzania